Patrick Dennistoun McGorry  FAA FASSA FAHMS FRCP FRANZCP (born 10 September 1952) is an Irish-born Australian psychiatrist known for his development of the early intervention services for emerging mental disorders in young people.

Position
McGorry is Professor of Youth Mental Health at the University of Melbourne. He has written more than 640 peer-reviewed articles with more than 56810 citations, published in journals including The Lancet, the British Journal of Psychiatry, the American Journal of Psychiatry and the Medical Journal of Australia. He is executive director of Orygen, The National Centre of Excellence in Youth Mental Health and founding editor of Early Intervention in Psychiatry published by the International Early Psychosis Association. McGorry also advocated strongly for the establishment of the Australian government funded National Youth Mental Health Foundation, which became headspace, and is a founding board member of that organisation. McGorry played a key role in leading the design, advocacy and scaling up of headspace services.

Early intervention in psychosis
McGorry and his colleagues developed an approach for young people who have symptoms of psychosis for the first time, based at the EPPIC clinic in Melbourne.  This EPPIC clinic has played a key part in an early psychosis treatment paradigm for psychiatry and has led to significant reform of mental health services, especially in the United Kingdom.  The EPPIC program's approach is best represented by the catch phrase "A stitch in time." A linked development is the PACE clinic: a service for young people with sub-threshold symptoms who are at risk of developing psychosis.

Initial evaluations of EPPIC showed that it was not only effective compared to the previous traditional model of care but that it was also cost effective.  Professor McGorry was awarded the Centenary Medal in 2003 in recognition of his work on the EPPIC program.

McGorry has also led research and new models of care for early intervention with young people who seek help for symptoms and impairment, and are known to be at risk for more severe psychosis, but whose psychotic symptoms are less intense, including the use of safer interventions than antipsychotic medication. He has generated a body of research to determine the correct sequence of treatment, that includes psychosocial interventions.

McGorry has advocated to the Australian government to create a national network of early psychosis intervention centres, based on evidence that early treatment may improve long-term outcomes. He has worked with all sides of politics in Australia to establish and improve early psychosis services. The early psychosis model of care has garnered bipartisan support, and was originally funded under the Gillard Labor government in 2011.

Criticisms
McGorry has faced a number of criticisms of his work.

Early intervention for psychosis was initially met with resistance due to a claimed lack of evidence. In 2011, a systematic review concluded: "There is some support for specialised early intervention services, but further trials would be desirable, and there is a question of whether gains are maintained." Some critics have argued that McGorry has exaggerated the evidence for early intervention and that long-term benefits and economic savings have not been established, and one has gone as far as alleging that McGorry has "systematically misled" the Australian Government about the nature and implications of his evaluation study on EPPIC by misstating the description of the control group.

Since these criticisms were made further evidence has accumulated. Cochrane level 1 evidence now exists demonstrating the effectiveness of early intervention for first episode psychosis  and for those at ultra-high risk for psychosis. Early intervention services for psychosis have been effective in reducing mortality rates  and providing a return on investment. They are also a preferred service model for consumers. In the past two decades evaluations in England and Denmark have shown that early intervention is effective over the first two years of care at least, but when patients return to traditional care some of the gains are lost. Canadian data indicates that if patients remain in early intervention services for five years the gains are sustained.

McGorry's views on giving antipsychotic medication to at-risk young people have been criticised by a number of people, including Allen Frances the Chair of the DSM-IV Taskforce, on the basis that most at-risk young people will not become psychotic and pre-emptive treatment may be risky. McGorry and his colleagues have responded to this criticism, arguing that critics have blurred the key distinction between clinical recommendations and ethically approved research designed to build evidence to more firmly guide clinical practice. A proposed trial of the antipsychotic medication quetiapine, led by McGorry, attracted criticism on ethical grounds. McGorry is published advocating for psychosocial strategies as a first-line intervention.

He has been accused of having a conflict of interest in using his position on a government advisory committee to advocate for programs that he founded. McGorry has denied that he has any conflict of interest and a spokesperson for the Australian government stated that Professor McGorry was just one member of the Mental Health Expert Working Group, which was made up of experts from a range of health and non-health sectors, plus consumer and carer representatives and 'while these consultations helped to inform the development of the government’s record mental health package, decisions on the specific content...were solely a matter for the government'. On 25 September 2012, Western Australian member of parliament Martin Whitely made a speech in parliament criticising the Australian Government for its support of McGorry's proposals. Whitely said that McGorry had made overblown claims for his programs and that they had been accepted without proper scrutiny. These criticisms are not supported by current evidence.

Youth Mental Health
Early intervention in psychosis has paved the way for a broader model of care (headspace) that targets a range of youth mental disorders. McGorry was a key architect of the headspace model, which has been replicated internationally. Headspace was originally founded under the Howard government with its support continuing under the Gillard government. Its design and national rollout has gained bipartisan support. During the 2013 Australian Federal election, McGorry appeared in the media together with then Opposition Leader Tony Abbott at the launch of the Liberal-National Coalition's mental health policy. Abbott promised that, if elected, he would provide additional financial support for research and translation programs associated with Patrick McGorry. After being elected to government, the Coalition announced in its first budget the allocation of $18M over 4 years to Orygen Youth Health Research Centre for establishment of a National Centre of Excellence in Youth Mental Health and $14.9M to headspace for the expansion of its youth mental health services. In 2018 the Turnbull Government committed to a three-year extension of funding ($13.5 million) to Orygen, The National Centre of Excellence in Youth Mental Health, and also committed an additional $30 million to headspace.

Although the headspace model has faced some criticism, its evidence-based benefits include improved service access and engagement, and modest improvements in outcomes compared to standard care. The success of headspace has seen it grow from 10 centres in 2007 to 110 in 2018 that are accessed by 100,000 young people each year, with an additional 30,000 accessing its online service eheadspace. The headspace model is currently being enhanced to improve service provision. It has been influential in several other nations in youth mental health reform, notably Ireland, Canada, Israel, Denmark and the Netherlands.

Recognition
In January 2010 McGorry was named Australian of the Year for his services to youth mental health. In June 2010 he was appointed an Officer of the Order of Australia. In 2013 Professor McGorry was honoured with the National Alliance on Mental Illness Scientific Research Award, the first time the award has been bestowed upon a researcher outside of the United States. In 2015, McGorry was awarded the Lieber Prize for Outstanding Achievement in Schizophrenia Research, given by the Brain & Behavior Research Foundation. In 2018 he was awarded the Lifetime Achievement Award by the Schizophrenia International Research Society. He was the first psychiatrist elected as a Fellow of the Australian Academy of Science. Professor McGorry served as President of the Society for Mental Health Research (Australia) (2013-2017), Schizophrenia International Research Society (2016-2018), and International Early Psychosis Association (1997-2006). He is currently President of the International Association for Youth Mental Health. He is a member of many advisory committees both nationally and internationally, including the Million Minds Mission for mental health launched by the Australian Government in 2018. He is a co-founder of Australians for Mental Health and serves on its board of directors.

McGorry is also an ambassador for the Beehive Foundation, an Australian charity that provides resilience programs for young people.

References

1952 births
Australian Fellows of the Royal College of Physicians
Australian of the Year Award winners
Australian psychiatrists
Fellows of the Academy of the Social Sciences in Australia
Fellows of the Australian Academy of Science
Irish emigrants to Australia
Living people
Melbourne Medical School alumni
Mental health activists
Monash University alumni
Officers of the Order of Australia
People educated at Bishop Gore School
Academic staff of the University of Melbourne
University of Sydney alumni
Fellows of the Australian Academy of Health and Medical Sciences
Australian republicans